Fauna of Switzerland may refer to:

 List of birds of Switzerland
 List of mammals of Switzerland

See also
 Outline of Switzerland